KMYS (channel 35) is a television station licensed to Kerrville, Texas, United States, serving the San Antonio area as an affiliate of the digital multicast network Dabl. It is owned by Deerfield Media, which maintains joint sales and shared services agreements (JSA/SSA) with Sinclair Broadcast Group, owner of dual NBC/CW affiliate WOAI-TV (channel 4) and Fox affiliate KABB (channel 29), for the provision of certain services. The stations share studios between Babcock Road and Sovereign Drive (off Loop 410) in northwest San Antonio, while KMYS' transmitter is located in rural southeastern Bandera County (near Lakehills). Despite Kerrville being KMYS' city of license, the station maintains no physical presence there.

History

Early history
The station first signed on the air on November 6, 1985, as KRRT. Despite being licensed to Kerrville, the original call sign stood not for its city of license, but rather for Washington, D.C.-based communications attorney Raul Robert Tapia. Tapia was the principal owner of Republic Communications Corporation, the station's founding ownership group. Republic Communications took its name from the Republic of Texas. TVX Broadcast Group originally held a 49% interest in Republic; by 1986 it had exercised an option to buy an additional 31% stake in the station, and would eventually acquire control of the remaining shares it did not own from Tapia. It was the first English-language general entertainment independent station in the San Antonio market, as well as the first English-language commercial television station in San Antonio since KONO-TV (channel 12, now KSAT-TV) signed on in January 1957.  In addition, it was the second television station in the market on the UHF dial, launching 30 years after what is now Spanish-speaking and Univision owned and operated station KWEX-DT.

Prior to the station's launch, San Antonio was the largest television market in the United States that did not have an independent station. Despite the large population of San Antonio proper (it had around 900,000 residents at the time the station signed on), San Antonio has always been a medium-sized market because the surrounding suburban and rural areas, then as now, were not much larger than San Antonio itself. San Antonio had been large enough to support an independent since at least the early 1970s. However, the market is a fairly large one geographically, and UHF stations do not carry very well across large areas. By the early 1980s, cable had gained enough penetration for a locally based independent to be viable.

The station originally operated from studio facilities located along Loop 410, near Ingram Park Mall, on the northwest side of the city.

Affiliations with Fox and then UPN
As part of a groupwide affiliation deal with TVX, KRRT became a charter affiliate of the Fox Broadcasting Company when the network launched on October 9, 1986. Paramount Pictures acquired a minority ownership interest in TVX in 1989; it would acquire the remaining interest in the company in 1991, changing its name to the Paramount Stations Group. At the time, KRRT was Paramount's smallest television station by market size. TVX had put KRRT on the block in 1989; the station was not sold at the time.

In 1994, Paramount entered into a partnership with Chris-Craft Industries—which owned NBC affiliate KMOL-TV (channel 4, now WOAI-TV) at the time—to create the United Paramount Network (UPN), with KRRT serving as the network's San Antonio affiliate.  While Chris-Craft Industries was the sole owner of the network initially, Paramount supplied most of its programming, with the latter's parent Viacom acquiring a 50% interest in UPN in 1996. Subsequently, River City Broadcasting signed an affiliation agreement for independent station KABB (channel 29) to become the market's new Fox affiliate. On January 16, 1995, KRRT became a charter affiliate of UPN, with KABB assuming the Fox affiliation.  With Paramount's stake in UPN, KRRT became the only English-speaking network owned-and-operated station in San Antonio.  Yet this status was short lived as Paramount sold the station to Jet Broadcasting later that year, which then entered into a local marketing agreement with River City. As part of the agreement, KABB took over KRRT's operations.

The arrangement was inherited by the Sinclair Broadcast Group following its acquisition of River City in 1996. Jet Broadcasting then sold the station to Glencairn, Ltd. (now Cunningham Broadcasting) in 1997. The family of Sinclair founder Julian Sinclair Smith owned 97% of Glencairn's stock (Glencairn was, in turn, to be paid with Sinclair stock for the purchases). For all intents and purposes, KABB and KRRT were a duopoly in violation of Federal Communications Commission (FCC) rules of the period. Glencairn had owned eleven television stations nationwide that Sinclair operated under LMAs; a later plan to sell five of its stations to Sinclair outright prompted the Rainbow/PUSH coalition (headed by Jesse Jackson) to file challenges, citing concerns over a single company holding two broadcast licenses in one market and arguing that Glencairn passed itself off as a minority-owned company (its president, former Sinclair executive Edwin Edwards, is African American) when it was really an arm of Sinclair, and used the LMA to gain control of the station. KRRT moved its operations to KABB's studios on Babcock Road.

As a WB affiliate
On July 21, 1997, Sinclair signed an affiliation agreement with The WB to switch the affiliations of KRRT and its four other UPN affiliates to the network. Prior to the agreement, San Antonio residents were only able to receive The WB's programming through cable and satellite from the national superstation feed of the network's Chicago affiliate WGN-TV and Austin's KNVA channel 54. KRRT affiliated with The WB on January 25, 1998, rebranding as "WB 35", although it later branded itself verbally as "San Antonio's WB". As a result, KMOL-TV began carrying UPN programming during the overnight hours as a secondary affiliation; the network would not have a full-time affiliate or have its prime time programming air in pattern until Fredericksburg-licensed KBEJ (channel 2), which at that time served both Austin and San Antonio, signed on in August 2000.

In the following years, KRRT's syndicated programming inventory shifted away from sitcoms (such as Family Matters, The Cosby Show, Married... with Children and The Andy Griffith Show) and movies, towards running more talk, reality and court shows (such as Judge Mills Lane and Judge Judy). It also gradually reduced cartoons from its schedule (including the Disney series Hercules: The Animated Series and Doug), The Real Adventures of Jonny Quest and Pocket Dragon Adventures. during the late 1990s, eventually limiting them mainly to the WB-provided programming block Kids' WB. After the FCC levied a $40,000 fine against Sinclair in 2001 for illegally controlling Glencairn, Sinclair purchased KRRT outright, creating the market's first television duopoly with KABB.

Switch to MyNetworkTV
On January 24, 2006, the Warner Bros. unit of Time Warner and CBS Corporation announced that the two companies would shut down The WB and UPN and combine the networks' respective programming to create a new "fifth" network called The CW. On February 22, 2006, News Corporation announced the launch of a new "sixth" network called MyNetworkTV, which would be operated by Fox Television Stations and its syndication division Twentieth Television.

KRRT was considered to be the likely candidate to become San Antonio's CW affiliate, since KBEJ had a rimshot signal that barely covered portions of the San Antonio and Austin metropolitan areas; most residents in both markets needed cable or satellite to get an acceptable signal from KBEJ. However, on March 2, 2006, Sinclair announced that most of its WB and UPN affiliates, including KRRT, would instead join MyNetworkTV; the CW affiliation ultimately went to channel 2—which changed its call letters to KCWX shortly afterward; this resulted in the station being dropped from Time Warner Cable's Austin system due to syndication exclusivity claims made by KNVA, which became that market's CW affiliate. To reflect the new affiliation, channel 35's call letters were changed to KMYS on June 19, 2006.

In September 2006, KABB stopped carrying Fox's children's program block, 4Kids TV; that station had carried the network's children's programming since the January 1995 affiliation swap with channel 35, it was moved to KMYS in order to accommodate the launch of a (short-lived) weekend expansion of its morning newscast Fox News First. The lineup remained on KMYS until 4Kids TV was discontinued by Fox (due to a dispute between the network and the block's lessee 4Kids Entertainment) in December 2008, after which Fox discontinued providing network-supplied children's programming until 2014. The infomercial block that replaced 4Kids TV, Weekend Marketplace, was also rejected by KABB and likewise, airs instead on KMYS.

As a CW affiliate
On February 12, 2010, Sinclair Broadcast Group signed an agreement with The CW to move its San Antonio affiliation from KCWX to KMYS; as a result, KMYS became the market's CW affiliate on August 30, with the MyNetworkTV affiliation moving to KCWX (ironically, the call letters of both stations continue to reference the affiliations they assumed in September 2006 following the respective shutdowns of The WB and UPN). This affiliation swap made KMYS the only television station in the United States to have been affiliated with all five of the major television networks that have debuted since 1986.

KMYS retained Weekend Marketplace on Saturday mornings, but opted to air The CW4Kids/Toonzai over two shorter blocks with the first two hours airing from 3:00 to 5:00 a.m. on Sunday mornings and the last three hours of the block airing from 2:00 to 5:00 a.m. on Monday mornings. Toonzai was replaced by Vortexx on August 25, 2012; however, KMYS continued to air that block in those same timeslots. Likewise, Vortexx's successor, Litton Entertainment's One Magnificent Morning, was carried in the same scheduling pattern (KMYS carries Litton's syndicated Go Time block as a weekday morning strip program in syndication, which features a 'best-of' selection of Litton's programming over the years, fulfilling the station's E/I programming requirements). As such, it was one of a handful of CW affiliates that does not air the network's children's program block in pattern, and one of the few stations in the country that air their affiliated network's children's programming at a time when the lineup's target audience would likely require the use of a DVR or the network's website to watch (WISN-TV in Milwaukee aired the non-E/I programming from ABC's now-defunct ABC Kids lineup on early Monday mornings before World News Now in 2005 before receiving network permission to drop it entirely). On October 9, 2017, the OMM block began airing on the station locally from 1:30 a.m. to 4:30 a.m.

On July 19, 2012, Sinclair announced that it would sell the license assets of KMYS to Deerfield Media (which acts in a similar structure to Glencairn/Cunningham Broadcasting in its relationship with Sinclair), in order to comply with FCC duopoly regulations following its purchase of WOAI-TV from Newport Television. As WOAI and KABB respectively ranked at fourth and fifth place with KMYS ranking sixth overall in the San Antonio market in terms of sign-on to sign-off viewership, the formal creation of the new duopoly between WOAI and KABB and the sale of KMYS to Deerfield received FCC approval that November. The transactions were completed on December 3, 2012; however, Sinclair retained control of KMYS' operations through joint sales and shared services agreements.

Although Sinclair controls all three stations, the operations of KMYS and KABB initially remained separate from that of WOAI-TV. Sinclair is in the process of moving certain WOAI operations from its longtime downtown studio on Navarro Street to a new building adjacent to KABB and KMYS' shared Babcock Road facility, which is expected to be finalized by the summer of 2014, with the news staffs of both stations fully operating out of a shared newsroom on the second floor of the main building.

2021 FCC fine
On July 28, 2021, the FCC issued a Forfeiture Order against Deerfield Media stemming from a lawsuit involving KMYS. The lawsuit, filed by AT&T, alleged that owner Deerfield Media failed to negotiate for retransmission consent in good faith for KMYS and other Sinclair-managed stations. Deerfield was ordered to pay a fine of $512,228 per station named in the lawsuit, including KMYS.

Shift of CW intellectual property to WOAI-DT2
On September 20, 2021, The CW affiliation and its surrounding syndicated schedule moved from KMYS to WOAI-TV's second subchannel, with "CW 35" branding was retained; Sinclair had shifted numerous affiliations from sidecar companies to subchannels on stations directly owned by them throughout 2021. Dabl moved from KMYS' third subchannel to its main channel. TBD moved from KABB's third subchannel to KMYS' second subchannel. The CW/syndicated schedule formerly on KMYS retained all previous cable and satellite channel positions.

Programming

Sports programming
KMYS has also televised select San Antonio Spurs since 1997. The team's local over-the-air broadcasts have split between KMYS and KENS (channel 5) since 2016.

Newscasts
While KRRT never carried a newscast as a Fox affiliate, station brass proposed launching a news operation on three separate occasions within the span of two years. Then-general manager Morrie Beitch proposed a 9-minute local news segment to launch January 1, 1991. The planned segment would cut-in to a national newscast being planned by Fox at the time, which ultimately did not launch.

In September 1991, KRRT attempted to make another go-round of establishing an in-house news department. This time, Beitch proposed a 30-minute 9 p.m. newscast, which would be San Antonio's first had it launched. Management targeted April 1992 as the launch date for the newscast. Paramount budgeted over $1 million for the endeavor, which would include a new studio, news vans and cameras, and the hiring of 14-16 staffers. KRRT did not plan to poach talent from the existing stations in the market, with Beitch telling the San Antonio Light, "we're not going to try to lure Chris Marrou away (of KENS-TV)". Beitch added that the news presentation would be "very direct" and that it was "not going to be glitzy". Beitch departed the station shortly thereafter and the news operation did not launch.

KRRT made a third attempt to launch news in February 1992. Newly appointed general manager Walt DeHaven (who transferred from sister station WTXF-TV in Philadelphia) said there was a "better than 50-50 chance" KRRT would enter the local news race. This time, management was angling for a launch in March 1993. Paramount budgeted $2.5 million to construct a new studio, purchase equipment, and hire 40 staffers. This newscast, like the others, never came to fruition.

In December 1997, KABB announced that it would produce a half-hour late afternoon newscast at 5:30 p.m. for KRRT, titled WB 35 News at 5:30. The program utilized the same anchors, meteorologist and sports staff seen on channel 29's 9:00 p.m. newscast. It would take on national newscasts that were airing on the Big Three networks at that timeslot. A point of difference between those programs and the new KRRT newscast was that it would focus mainly on local content in a fast-paced format, according to KABB's then-news director Alan Little. The new program launched on Monday, March 9, 1998. Four additional staffers were hired to accommodate the expansion; additional equipment was also purchased. The program was cancelled in 2001 due to low ratings.

Technical information

Subchannels
The station's ATSC 1.0 channels are carried on the multiplexed digital signals of other San Antonio television stations:

Analog-to-digital conversion
On February 2, 2009, Sinclair told cable and satellite television providers via e-mail that regardless of the exact mandatory switchover date to digital-only broadcasting for full-power stations (which Congress rescheduled for June 12 days later), the station would shut down its analog signal on the original transition date of February 17, making KABB and KMYS the first television stations in the market to convert to digital-only broadcast transmissions.

KMYS discontinued regular programming on its analog signal, over UHF channel 35, on February 17, 2009, the original target date for full-power television stations in the United States to transition from analog to digital broadcasts under federal mandate (which Congress had moved the previous month to June 12). The station's digital signal remained on its pre-transition UHF channel 32, using PSIP to display its virtual channel as its former analog channel 35.

References

External links
 ASR Registration for KMYS's Tower

ATSC 3.0 television stations
Dabl affiliates
TBD (TV network) affiliates
Stadium (sports network) affiliates
Sinclair Broadcast Group
Television channels and stations established in 1985
MYS
1985 establishments in Texas